Hoploscopa diffusa is a moth in the family Crambidae, first described by George Hampson in 1919. It is found in New Guinea, where it has been recorded from the D'Entrecasteaux Islands.

References

Moths described in 1919
Hoploscopini